Hana Sadiq is an Iraqi fashion designer who has held fashion shows in Amman, Naples, Beirut and Dubai. Her customers include Queen Noor and Queen Rania of Jordan and members of the House of Saud.

Sadiq had a degree in French Literature from the University of Baghdad. Sadiq studied fashion in Paris, France and has split her time between Amman, Jordon and Paris since 1982.

References

External links
Official Site

Year of birth missing (living people)
Living people
Iraqi fashion designers
Artists from Baghdad
Iraqi women artists
Iraqi contemporary artists
Iraqi women fashion designers